The 2022–23 season is the 101st season in the existence of Konyaspor and the club's 10th consecutive season in the top flight of Turkish football. In addition to the domestic league, Konyaspor are participating in this season's edition of the Turkish Cup and the UEFA Europa Conference League. The season covers the period from 1 July 2022 to 30 June 2023.

Players

First-team squad

Out on loan

Pre-season and friendlies

Competitions

Overall record

Süper Lig

League table

Results summary

Results by round

Matches 
The league schedule was released on 4 July.

Turkish Cup

UEFA Europa Conference League

References 

Konyaspor
Konyaspor